Muriel T. Yacavone (May 16, 1920 – December 18, 2012) was an American politician.

From Hartford, Connecticut, Yacavone served the 9th District in the Connecticut House of Representatives, encompassing the area of East Hartford and Manchester from 1970 to 1982.  She also served on the town council for South Windsor.

After graduating from high school, Yacavone joined The Rockettes in 1938.  She enlisted in the Marine Corps during World War II.

Yacavone died on December 18, 2012, at the age of 92 after a brief illness.

Notes

1920 births
2012 deaths
Politicians from Hartford, Connecticut
Members of the Connecticut House of Representatives
Women state legislators in Connecticut
United States Marine Corps personnel of World War II
20th-century American women politicians
20th-century American politicians
Connecticut city council members
Women city councillors in Connecticut
21st-century American women